Men and Masculinities is a quarterly peer-reviewed academic journal covering men's studies. It was established in 1998 and is published by SAGE Publications. The Co-Editors are Drs Kristen Barber, Tristan Bridges, and Joseph D. Nelson.

Abstracting and indexing 
The journal is abstracted and indexed in Scopus and the Social Sciences Citation Index. According to the Journal Citation Reports, the journal has a 2017 impact factor of 1.863, ranking it 35th out of 146 journals in the category "Sociology".

References

External links 
 

Gender studies journals
Men and feminism
Queer theory
Men's studies journals
Masculinity
SAGE Publishing academic journals
Publications established in 1998
Quarterly journals
English-language journals